XenForo is a commercial Internet forum software package written in the PHP programming language.  The software is developed by former vBulletin lead developers Kier Darby and Mike Sullivan. The first public beta release of XenForo was released in October 2010, the stable version on March 8, 2011.  The program includes several search engine optimization (SEO) features.

On November 12, 2014, Chris Deeming joined the development team. One of his products, Xen Media Gallery, now XenForo Media Gallery, joined the XenForo family of products.

Development
One of the developers of XenForo, Kier Darby, had been a lead developer for the community platform vBulletin. The original owner of vBulletin, Jelsoft, was acquired by the American new media company Internet Brands in 2007. Disagreements occurred between the developers and the new management and most of the vBulletin developers left Internet Brands in 2009. Darby and other former vBulletin developers began work on a new platform, XenForo.

Internet Brands lawsuits
One day before the scheduled release of the first public beta of XenForo in October 2010, Internet Brands announced that it would file a lawsuit against the XenForo team in the UK, claiming: copyright infringement of property acquired by Internet Brands, use of code in XenForo that was refactored from vBulletin code, breach of contract, and engaging in unfair business practices. Representatives  stated that XenForo "unfairly stands on the shoulders of more than a decade of development", development which had become the property of Internet Brands through the acquisition.   Internet Brands  denied that the timing of the lawsuit was to coincide with the  public beta. In November 2010, Internet Brands sued XenForo and Darby in California District Court in the United States, additionally claiming that Darby had not returned confidential information from Internet Brands regarding the vBulletin software. The XenForo team  denied the claims.  

On February 28, 2013, XenForo announced that the lawsuit had been settled between the parties in both the UK and the US. Although specific terms of the agreement are   confidential, Internet Brands withdrew both the US and UK lawsuits.  XenForo announced that all license holders with a valid license from June 19, 2012 would receive an additional 255 days of support and download access.

Release history

See also
Comparison of Internet forum software

References

External links

Internet forum software
2010 software
PHP software